Power of the Damager is the seventh studio album by American metal band Prong. It was released through 13th Planet Records on October 2, 2007. The album peaked at No. 47 on the Billboard Top Heatseekers chart.

Track listing

Personnel 
Tommy Victor – guitar, vocals, producer
Monte Pittman – bass guitar, backing vocals, additional lead guitar (track 12), associate producer
Aaron Rossi – drums
Al Jourgensen – keyboards and mixing (track 6)
Gil Elguezabal, Marco A. Ramirez – audio engineers
John Bilberry – mix engineer
Charles Godfrey – assistant engineer
Lawton Outlaw – artwork
Allan Amato – photography

Charts

References 

2007 albums
Prong (band) albums
Albums produced by Al Jourgensen
Albums produced by Tommy Victor
Albums recorded at Sonic Ranch